James Cox (born November 13, 2000) is an American soccer player who currently plays for Charleston Battery in the USL Championship.

Career
On June 24, 2019, Cox signed for USL Championship side Charleston Battery.

References

2000 births
Living people
American soccer players
Association football midfielders
Charleston Battery players
Soccer players from South Carolina
USL Championship players
Sportspeople from Charleston, South Carolina